Grammodes quaesita is a moth of the family Noctuidae first described by Charles Swinhoe in 1901. It is found in Australia's Northern Territory and Queensland.

The wingspan is about 30 mm.

References

Ophiusina
Moths described in 1901